John de Beauchamp, 1st Baron Beauchamp "de Somerset" (25 July 1274 – October/December 1336), was feudal baron of Hatch Beauchamp in Somerset.

Origins
He was born on 25 July 1274, the son and heir of John de Beauchamp (died 1283), feudal baron of Hatch, seated at Hatch Beauchamp in Somerset, by his wife Cicely de Vivonne/de Forz (died 1320), one of the four daughters and co-heiresses of William de Vivonne/de Forz (died 1259), who had held a half share of the feudal barony of Curry Mallet in Somerset. Cicely thus inherited a one-eighth share of the barony of Curry Malet.

Career
In 1299 he was created by writ Baron Beauchamp "de Somerset".

Marriage and children
At some time before 1301 he married Joan Chenduit, by whom he had issue including:
John de Beauchamp, 2nd Baron Beauchamp (1304–1343), eldest son and heir;
William de Beauchamp; 
Joan de Beauchamp, wife of John de Cobham, 2nd Baron Cobham (d. 1355), of Cobham, Kent;
Alienor de Beauchamp;
Beatrice de Beauchamp.

Death
He died between October and December 1336.

References

1274 births
1336 deaths
People from Somerset
13th-century English people
Barons in the Peerage of England
John